Maulana Sadr-ud-Din (died 14–15 November 1981) became the first missionary of the Ahmadiyya Anjuman Ishaat-i-Islam Lahore in the Wilmersdorfer Moschee (Berlin Mosque) in 1922.

Work  

 Der Koran: Arabisch-Deutsch: Übersetzung, Einleitung und Erklärung von Maulana Sadr-ud-Din (Berlin: Verlag der Moslemischen Revue (self published) 1939). 2. unveränderte Auflage 1964; 3. unveränderte Auflage 2006.

References

Emirs of the Lahore Ahmadiyya Movement
1981 deaths
Pakistani Ahmadis
Pakistani expatriates in Germany
Year of birth missing